George Wald (November 18, 1906 – April 12, 1997) was an American scientist who studied pigments in the retina.  He won a share of the 1967 Nobel Prize in Physiology or Medicine with Haldan Keffer Hartline and Ragnar Granit.

In 1970, Wald predicted that “civilization will end within 15 or 30 years unless immediate action is taken against problems facing mankind.”

Research 

As a postdoctoral researcher, Wald discovered that vitamin A was a component of the retina.  His further experiments showed that when the pigment rhodopsin was exposed to light, it yielded the protein opsin and a compound containing vitamin A.  This suggested that vitamin A was essential in retinal function.

In the 1950s, Wald and his colleagues used chemical methods to extract pigments from the retina.  Then, using a spectrophotometer, they were able to measure the light absorbance of the pigments.  Since the absorbance of light by retina pigments corresponds to the wavelengths that best activate photoreceptor cells, this experiment showed the wavelengths that the eye could best detect.  However, since rod cells make up most of the retina, what Wald and his colleagues were specifically measuring was the absorbance of rhodopsin, the main photopigment in rods. Later, with a technique called microspectrophotometry, he was able to measure the absorbance directly from cells, rather than from an extract of the pigments. This allowed Wald to determine the absorbance of pigments in the cone cells (Goldstein, 2001).

Biography 

George Wald was born in New York City, the son of Ernestine (Rosenmann) and Isaac Wald, Jewish immigrant parents.  He was a member of the first graduating class of the Brooklyn Technical High School in New York in 1923.  He received his Bachelor of Science degree from New York University in 1927 and his PhD in zoology from Columbia University in 1932.  After graduating, he received a travel grant from the US National Research Council. Wald used this grant to work in Germany with Otto Heinrich Warburg where he identified vitamin A in the retina. Wald then went on to work in Zurich, Switzerland with the discoverer of vitamin A, Paul Karrer.  Wald then worked briefly with Otto Fritz Meyerhof in Heidelberg, Germany, but left Europe for the University of Chicago in 1933 when Adolf Hitler came to power and life in Europe became more dangerous for Jews.  In 1934, Wald went to Harvard University where he became an instructor, then a professor.

Wald was elected to the American Academy of Arts and Sciences in 1948. He was elected to the National Academy of Sciences in 1950, the American Philosophical Society in 1958, and in 1967 was awarded the Nobel Prize for Physiology or Medicine for his discoveries in vision. In 1966 he was awarded the  Frederic Ives Medal by the OSA and in 1967 the Paul Karrer Gold Medal of the University of Zurich.

Wald spoke out on many political and social issues and his fame as a Nobel laureate brought national and international attention to his views. He was a pacifist and vocal opponent of the Vietnam War and the nuclear arms race. Speaking at MIT in 1969 Wald said, "Our government has become preoccupied with death, with the business of killing and being killed." In 1980, Wald served as part of Ramsey Clark's delegation to Iran during the Iran hostage crisis.

With a small number of other Nobel laureates, he was invited in 1986 to fly to Moscow to advise Mikhail Gorbachev on a number of environmental questions. While there, he questioned Gorbachev about the arrest, detention and exile of Yelena Bonner and her husband, fellow Nobel laureate Andrei Sakharov (Peace prize, 1975). Wald reported that Gorbachev said he knew nothing about it. Bonner and Sakharov were released shortly thereafter, in December 1986.

A member of the Circumcision resource center in Boston, he was one of the first scientists committed against circumcision but his article "Circumcision", rejected by the New York Times in 1975, was published in 2012 only by an English magazine (http://churchandstate.org.uk/2012/12/what-jewish-nobelist-george-wald-had-to-say-about-circumcision/ ).

Wald died in Cambridge, Massachusetts. He was married twice: in 1931 to Frances Kingsley (1906-1980) and in 1958 to the biochemist Ruth Hubbard. He had two sons with Kingsley—Michael and David; he and Hubbard had a son—the award-winning musicologist and musician Elijah Wald—and a daughter, Deborah, a prominent family law attorney. He was an atheist.

See also 
 List of Jewish Nobel laureates
 Retinal

References

Further reading

 Goldstein, B. 2001. Sensation and Perception, 6th ed. London: Wadsworth.

External links 

 
 John E. Dowling, "George Wald, 1906–1997: A Biographical Memoir" in Biographical Memoirs, Washington, D.C.: The National Academy Press (National Academy of Sciences), Volume 78, 298:317.
 A remembrance by his son Elijah
 Papers of George Wald : an inventory

Two of George Wald's speeches can be read on-line:
 A Generation in Search of a Future
 The Origin of Death

1906 births
1997 deaths
Nobel laureates in Physiology or Medicine
American Nobel laureates
American neuroscientists
Jewish American atheists
Visual system
Jewish neuroscientists
Recipients of the Albert Lasker Award for Basic Medical Research
American tax resisters
Columbia University alumni
Harvard University faculty
New York University alumni
Institute for Advanced Study visiting scholars
American anti–nuclear weapons activists
Jewish American scientists
American anti–Vietnam War activists
Members of the United States National Academy of Sciences
Brooklyn Technical High School alumni
Vision scientists
Scientists from New York (state)
Articles containing video clips
Vitamin researchers
Members of the American Philosophical Society